Stadion Dózsa György út is a sports stadium in Vecsés, Hungary. The stadium is home to the famous association football side Vecsési FC. The stadium has a capacity of 3,000.

Attendance

Records
Record Attendance:
 10,000 Vecsés v Ferencváros, November 15, 2008.

External links 
Magyarfutball.hu 

Football venues in Hungary